Rachel Levy is the name of:
Gertrude Rachel Levy (1884–1966), British cultural historian who published under the name G. Rachel Levy
R.L. Kelly, American electropop musician born as Rachel Levy
Rachel Levy (mathematician)
Rachel Levy (1984 or 1985–2002), Israeli victim of the Kiryat HaYovel supermarket bombing
Sergeant Rachel Levy (circa 1982 – 2001), Israeli victim of the 2001 Azor attack
Rachel Levy, American college basketball player on the 2017–18 Harvard Crimson women's basketball team

It is also the name of fictional characters:
Rachel Levy, fictional character in 1930 mystery novel by Dorothy Sayers, Strong Poison
Rachel Levy, fictional character in British medical drama television series Holby City (series 17)
Rachel Lévy, fictional character in French soap opera television series Plus belle la vie
Rachel Levy, fictional character in Israeli comical musical telenovela HaShir Shelanu
Rachel Levy, fictional character in American comedy-drama The Family Tree (2011 film)